Kenneth Howard Menke (October 2, 1922 – September 2, 2002) was an American professional basketball player. He played in the National Basketball League for the Fort Wayne Zollner Pistons in 1947–48 and the Waterloo Hawks in the  National Basketball Association during the latter half of the 1949–50 season.

References

1922 births
2002 deaths
American men's basketball players
Basketball players from Illinois
Fort Wayne Zollner Pistons players
Guards (basketball)
Illinois Fighting Illini men's basketball players
People from West Dundee, Illinois
Waterloo Hawks players